Samuel Russell (January 29, 1848 – February 26, 1924) was a Presbyterian missionary, newspaper editor and politician in New Brunswick and Ontario, Canada. He represented Hastings East in the Legislative Assembly of Ontario from 1898 to 1904 as a Liberal.

The son of James Russell and Ann Carruthers, natives of Ireland, he was born in Newcastle, New Brunswick and was educated there and at the University of New Brunswick. Russell went on to study theology at Queen's University and the University of Glasgow. In 1872, he began preaching in Red Bank and Black River. Russell was ordained in Newcastle in 1873. He served as a minister in Newcastle. In 1876, he moved to Montreal. From 1878 to 1880, he served as pastor at the Scotch Colony at Kincardine, New Brunswick. Russell apparently subsequently left the ministry.

He married Evelyn M. Davis. Russell later moved to Deseronto, where he was editor of the Tribune.

He died in Belleville at the age of 76. At the time of his death, Russell was registrar for Hastings County.

References

External links

1848 births
1924 deaths
Canadian newspaper editors
Canadian male journalists
Canadian Presbyterian ministers
Ontario Liberal Party MPPs